Pteroplatus dimidiatipennis is a species of beetle in the family Cerambycidae. It was described by Buquet in 1841.

References

Pteroplatini
Beetles described in 1841